Kekana is a South African surname. Notable people with the surname include:

Grant Kekana (born 1992), South African footballer
Hlompho Kekana (born 1985), South African footballer
Johannes Kekana (born 1972), South African long-distance runner
Pinky Kekana (born 1966), South African politician 
Steve Kekana (1958–2021), South African singer and songwriter